Mauritz Pousette (1 July 1824 – 27 February 1883) was a Swedish actor.

Biography
Mauritz Constantin Pousette was the son of the jeweler Carl Anders Pousette (1792–1873) and Carolina Sophia Sundberg (1794–1859).

Pousette was hired by court secretaries Berggren, P. Deland and Stjernström. He had his own company together with Oscar Andersson and Wilhelm Åhman 1863–1867 in the countryside and at Humlegårdsteatern in Stockholm. He was involved with the Mindre teatern in Stockholm and the New Theater in Gothenburg 1867–1874 and at the New Theater in Stockholm 1874–1883. Among the roles he played are Carl IX in Bartholomeinatten, Ingomar in Skogens son, Posa in Don Carlos, Narcisse Rameau, Erasmus Montanus, Carl II in Don Cesar de Bazano and Gaston in Klädeshandlaren och hans måg.

He was first married to the actress Charlotte Pousette (1832–1877) and then to the actress Johanna Vilhelmina “Mina” Hagelin (1849–1929). He had a daughter Cecilia Constance Amalia Sofia Pousette (1863–1928), who became a teacher, and a son Mauritz Ingemar Pousette (1881–1952), who became an engineer.

He died on 27 February 1883 in Hedvig Eleonora Parish in Stockholm.

Theater

Roles (incomplete)

References 

1824 births
1883 deaths
19th-century Swedish actors
Swedish stage actors
Mauritz
Mauritz